Toiler, Toilers, The Toiler or The Toilers may refer to:

Films
The Toilers (1919 film), starring Ronald Colman
The Toilers (1928 film), featuring Douglas Fairbanks, Jr.

Maritime vessels
, a US Navy rescue and salvage ship that was cancelled
Empire Toiler, an Empire ship transferred to Belgium in 1943
Toiler, a commercial vessel built by British shipbuilder Swan Hunter, completed or launched in 1910

Newspapers
The Newcastle Argus and District Advertiser, an Australian newspaper later named The Toiler (1920-1921)
Daily Worker, a Communist Party USA newspaper called the Toiler from 1919 to 1922
The Toiler, an American 19th century newspaper founded and edited by Peter J. McGuire

Sports
Winnipeg Toilers, a former Senior "A" men's basketball team in Winnipeg, Manitoba, Canada
Toiler, nickname of Ed Harrison (footballer) (1884-1917), Australian rules footballer
Toiler, mascot and sports teams of Manual Arts High School, Los Angeles, California

Other uses
Trudoviks or Toilers, an early 20th century political party in Russia
Toilers Mountain, Victoria Land, Antarctica

See also
Toil (disambiguation)
Tillie the Toiler, an American newspaper comic strip from 1921 to 1959, as well as two films based on it